Claudio Vázquez Rodríguez (born April 6, 1982 Salvatierra, Guanajuato, Mexico), is a Mexican football manager and former player.

External links
 

1982 births
Living people
People from Salvatierra, Guanajuato
Mexican footballers
Mexican football managers
Liga MX players
Association football midfielders
21st-century Mexican people
Footballers from Guanajuato